"Remix of Gackt" is an unofficial remix single of Gackt songs released on November 3, 1999. The single includes 4 tracks consistent of "Mizérable" and "Vanilla", remixed by 4 different DJs. It peaked at thirteenth place on the Oricon weekly chart and charted for four weeks.

Track listing

References

1999 singles
Gackt songs